Mr. Pickles is an American animated sitcom, which aired from September 21, 2014 to November 18, 2019, on Cartoon Network's late-night programming block Adult Swim. The series revolves around the Goodman family and their demonic dog Mr. Pickles.

Series overview 
{| class="wikitable" style="text-align:center;"
|-
! colspan="2" rowspan="2" |Season
! rowspan="2" |Episodes
! colspan="2" |Originally aired
|-
! First aired
! Last aired
|-
| style="background:#979797;" |
| colspan="2" | Pilot
| colspan="2" | 
|-
| bgcolor="#6c6" |
| 1
| 10
| 
| 
|-
| bgcolor="#FF5F5F" |
| 2
| 10
| 
| 
|-
| bgcolor="#FFCBCF" |
| 3
| 10
| 
| 
|-
| style="background:#740C8E;" |
| colspan="2" | Finale
| colspan="2" | 
|-
|}

Episodes

Pilot (2013)

Season 1 (2014)

Season 2 (2016)

Season 3 (2018)

Series Finale (2019)

References 

Mr. Pickles
Mr. Pickles